Spatuloricaria curvispina is a species of catfish in the family Loricariidae. It is native to South America, where it occurs in the Magdalena River basin in Colombia. The species reaches 40 cm (15.7 inches) in standard length.

References 

Fish described in 1942
Catfish of South America
Freshwater fish of Colombia
Loricariini